Boronia suberosa is a species of plant in the citrus family Rutaceae and is endemic to a small area in the Northern Territory, Australia. It is a shrub with weeping branches, simple leaves, and flowers with four small, white petals.

Description
Its branches are covered with star-shaped hairs when young but become very corky with age.

Taxonomy and naming
Boronia suberosa was first formally described in 1997 by Marco F. Duretto who published the description in the journal Austrobaileya. The specific epithet (suberosa) is a Latin word meaning "corky".

Distribution and habitat
This boronia grows on sandstone rocks and cliff faces and is only known from the Ja Ja formation in Kakadu National Park.

Conservation status
This species is listed as "near threatened" under the Territory Parks and Wildlife Conservation Act 2000.

References 

suberosa
Flora of the Northern Territory
Plants described in 1997
Taxa named by Marco Duretto